The 2022–23 network late night television schedule for the four major English-language commercial broadcast networks in the United States covers the late night hours from September 2022 to August 2023. The schedule is followed by a list per network of returning series, new series, and series canceled after the 2021–22 television season.

PBS is not included at all, as its member television stations have local flexibility over most of their schedules and broadcast times for network shows may vary. (PBS does offer its member stations packages of Amanpour & Company and BBC World News to air in late night timeslots Monday–Friday, and optional overnight access to its satellite feed, which rebroadcasts prime time programs shown either the previous evening or earlier in the week.) Ion Television is not included since the network's late-night schedule consists of syndicated drama reruns and paid programming, nor are MyNetworkTV and The CW as neither programming service offer late night programs of any kind.

Fox is not included in the weekday schedule, as it only airs late night network programming on Saturdays, and ABC and CBS are not included in the weekend schedule as both networks only air late night network programming on weekdays (except overruns of primetime programming due to sports). NBC is not included on Sundays as it does not offer any network late night programming on Sundays year-round (outside of overruns of its prime time Sunday Night Football game telecasts into the late night time period during Fall).

Legend

Schedule 

 New series are highlighted in bold.
 All times correspond to U.S. Eastern and Pacific Time scheduling (except for some live sports or events). Except where affiliates slot certain programs outside their network-dictated timeslots, subtract one hour for Central, Mountain, Alaska, and Hawaii-Aleutian times.
 Local schedules may differ, as affiliates have the option to pre-empt or delay network programs, and fill timeslots not allocated to network programs with local, syndicated, or paid programming at their discretion. Such scheduling may be limited to preemptions caused by local or national breaking news or weather coverage (which may force stations to tape delay certain programs in overnight timeslots or defer them to a co-operated station or a digital subchannel in their regular timeslot) and any overrunning major sports events scheduled to air in a weekday timeslot (mainly during major holidays). Stations may air shows at other times at their preference.
 All sporting events air live in all time zones in correspondence to U.S. Eastern Time with local and/or overnight programming after game completion.
 CBS's Late night programming is scheduled to be delayed on March 16, 17, 23 and 24, April 1 and 3 for the network’s coverage of 2023 March Madness.

Weekday late nights

Note: 
 ABC, CBS and NBC affiliates offer their rebroadcasts of the network evening newscasts to accommodate local scheduling in selecting markets that do not offer encores of the local late news; some stations that air encores of their local late newscasts will air the rebroadcast alongside the network evening news rebroadcasts (either acting as a lead-in to the networks' overnight newscasts), or with syndicated and time-lease programs.

Saturday late night

Notes:
 NBC affiliates offer their rebroadcasts of the network evening newscasts to accommodate local scheduling in selecting markets that do not offer encores of the local late news; some stations that air encores of their local late newscasts will air the rebroadcast alongside the network evening news rebroadcasts (either acting as a lead-in to the networks' overnight newscasts), or with syndicated and time-lease programs.
 Fox's late night lineup begins at 11 p.m. PT/10 p.m. MT on weeks when Fox Sports programming goes beyond 11 p.m. ET/10 p.m. CT and at the sporting event's conclusion in the Eastern and Central time zones.

By network

ABC
Returning series:
Jimmy Kimmel Live!
Nightline

CBS
Returning series:
@midnight 
The Late Show with Stephen Colbert
The Late Late Show with James Corden

Fox

Returning series:
Beat Shazam 
Fox College Football
Hell's Kitchen 
Name That Tune 

Not returning from 2021–22
I Can See Your Voice

NBC

Returning series:
Late Night with Seth Meyers
Saturday Night Live
The Tonight Show Starring Jimmy Fallon

See also
2022–23 United States network television schedule (prime-time)
2022–23 United States network television schedule (morning)
2022–23 United States network television schedule (afternoon)
2022–23 United States network television schedule (overnight)

References

External links
 TV Guide Listings

United States late night network television schedules
2022 in American television
2023 in American television